Bahrain participated in the 3rd West Asian Games held in Doha, Qatar from 1 December 2005 to 10 December 2005. Bahrain ranked 9th with 3 gold medals and 2 silver medals in this edition of the West Asian Games.

References

West Asian Games
Nations at the 2005 West Asian Games
West Asian Games
Bahrain at the West Asian Games